The 2006 Brands Hatch Superbike World Championship round was the eighth round of the 2006 Superbike World Championship. It took place on the weekend of 4–6 August 2006 at the Brands Hatch circuit.

Results

Superbike race 1 classification

Superbike race 2 classification

Supersport race classification

References
 Superbike Race 1
 Superbike Race 2
 Supersport Race

Brands
Brands Hatch Superbike